White Crane Kung-Fu may refer to:
Fujian White Crane, a southern Chinese martial art
Tibetan White Crane, a western/southern Chinese martial art
Crane kick